Brimage is a surname. Notable people with the surname include:

Marcus Brimage (born 1985), American mixed martial artist
Thomas Brimage (1866–1915), Australian businessman and politician
Thomas Abel Brimage Spratt (1811–1888), English vice-admiral, hydrographer and geologist
William Brimage Bate (1826–1905), American Confederate veteran and politician